Age of Empires: Mythologies is a turn-based strategy video game based on Age of Mythology. It is the sequel to Age of Empires: The Age of Kings for the Nintendo DS.

Gameplay
Unlike the original Age of Mythology for the PC, Age of Empires: Mythologies is turn-based as opposed to real-time strategy, where in the vein of Advance Wars and the previous Age of Empires: The Age of Kings, each player is given a turn where their units can make single actions within that turn such as moving to an opposing unit and attacking or capturing or constructing buildings. Every time two rival players' units attack one another, a brief animation of a group of each unit engaging in combat is played on the top screen, along with the resulting damage to their hit points. In standard games, players collect three resources – food, gold and favor – to construct buildings and eventually train units for combat. To gain further units, technologies and buildings, players advance "Ages", starting in the Archaic Age, a feature prominently used in the Age of Empires series.

Like the original Age of Mythology, there are three civilizations available – Greek, Egyptian and Norse – each with their own unique units, buildings, powers and method of obtaining favor. Each has three "major gods" to choose from before each game – Zeus, Hades and Poseidon for the Greeks; Ra, Isis and Set for the Egyptians, and Odin, Thor and Loki for the Norse. Additionally, each has "minor gods" to select from every time the player advances an age, with all deities granting the player unique technologies, perks, myth units and God powers that are used to damage or benefit players. There are three types of base unit – humans, heroes and myth units, the latter two being mythical figures or creatures from the historical civilization's mythology and legends. A rock-paper-scissors model governs which units are best suited against others; for example, humans are good against heroes but weak against myth units. Every unit also has a sub-category such as heavy infantry or archers, again with each being better suited against certain others. Human units include hoplites or chariot archers, heroes include Odysseus and Ramesses, and myth units include Cyclopes and giants.

Unlike the original Age of Mythology, Age of Empires: Mythologies is less faithful to the historical mythologies; for example, Poseidon has no access to Cyclopes but Zeus and Hades do; Hades has no access to Underworld Passage but Zeus and Poseidon do.

Reception

References

External links
IGN page
Age of Empires: Mythologies Coming To DS

2008 video games
Mythologies
Age of Mythology
Griptonite Games
Multiplayer and single-player video games
Multiplayer online games
Nintendo DS games
Nintendo DS-only games
Nintendo Wi-Fi Connection games
THQ games
Turn-based strategy video games
Video games based on multiple mythologies
Video games developed in the United States
Video games set in antiquity